Krys is a given name. Notable people with the name include:

Krys Barch (born 1980), Canadian hockey player
Krys Barnes (born 1988), American football player
Krys Kolanos (born 1981), Canadian hockey player
Krys Lee, South Korean author, journalist, and translator
Krys Sobieski (born 1950), Polish soccer player and coach

See also
Kris (name), given name and surname